Joan of Châtillon (Jeanne de Blois; 1253? – 19 or 29 January 1291) was Countess of Blois from 1280 to 1291, and Lady of Avesnes.

She was the daughter of John I, Count of Blois and Alix of Brittany, Dame de Pontarcy.

Joan received the County of Chartres from her father during his life; she later sold these lands to Philip IV of France in 1286. She ceded the lordship of Avesnes to her cousin Hugh before her death. When she died in 1291 the other titles were left to him also.

In 1263, Joanne married Peter of Alençon, a son of King Louis IX of France and Margaret of Provence. They had two sons who both died in infancy:
Louis (1272–1273).
Philip (1274–1275).

Joan died in 1291, with no living issue. She left the title of Count of Blois and her remaining titles to her cousin Hugh.

References

1291 deaths
Jeanne
Joan
Joan
13th-century French nobility
13th-century French women
Joan
Year of birth unknown
Year of birth uncertain
13th-century women rulers